Spelle is a Samtgemeinde in the district Emsland in Lower Saxony, Germany. Its seat is in the municipality Spelle.

The Samtgemeinde Spelle consists of the following municipalities:

 Lünne 
 Schapen 
 Spelle

Samtgemeinden in Lower Saxony